Sparks! is the debut album by soul jazz guitarist Melvin Sparks recorded for the Prestige label in 1970.

Reception

The Allmusic site awarded the album 3 stars calling it "A solid soul-jazz outing that looks to commercial material for the bulk of the set, but doesn't unduly compromise itself in a pop direction... commercial choices, to be sure, but executed with relaxed grit".

Track listing
 "Thank You (Falettinme Be Mice Elf Agin)" (Sly Stone) - 8:08  
 "I Didn't Know What Time It Was" (Lorenz Hart, Richard Rodgers) - 6:35  
 "Charlie Brown" (Jerry Leiber, Mike Stoller) - 5:55  
 "The Stinker" (Leon Spencer) - 7:00  
 "Spill the Wine" (Papa Dee Allen, Harold Ray Brown, B.B. Dickerson, Lonnie Jordan, Charles Miller, Lee Oskar, Howard Scott) - 11:10

Personnel
Melvin Sparks - guitar
Virgil Jones - trumpet
John Manning, Houston Person (tracks 3 & 4) - tenor saxophone
Leon Spencer - organ
Idris Muhammad - drums

Production
 Bob Porter - producer
 Rudy Van Gelder - engineer

References

Melvin Sparks albums
1970 debut albums
Prestige Records albums
Albums produced by Bob Porter (record producer)
Albums recorded at Van Gelder Studio